A court of appeals is generally an appellate court.

Court of Appeals may refer to:

Israeli Military Court of Appeals
 (Italy)
Court of Appeals of the Philippines
High Court of Appeals of Turkey
Court of Appeals (Vatican City)

United States 
Courts of appeals
Court of Appeals for the Armed Forces
Court of Appeals for Veterans Claims
Court of Appeals for the Federal Circuit
Court of Appeals for the District of Columbia Circuit
Court of Appeals for the First Circuit
Court of Appeals for the Second Circuit
Court of Appeals for the Third Circuit
Court of Appeals for the Fourth Circuit
Court of Appeals for the Fifth Circuit
Court of Appeals for the Sixth Circuit
Court of Appeals for the Seventh Circuit
Court of Appeals for the Eighth Circuit
Court of Appeals for the Ninth Circuit
Court of Appeals for the Tenth Circuit
Court of Appeals for the Eleventh Circuit
Emergency Court of Appeals
Temporary Emergency Court of Appeals (defunct)
Alabama Court of Appeals (existed until 1969)
Alaska Court of Appeals
Arizona Court of Appeals
Arkansas Court of Appeals
Colorado Court of Appeals
District of Columbia Court of Appeals
Georgia Court of Appeals
Hawaii Intermediate Court of Appeals
Idaho Court of Appeals
Illinois Court of Appeals
Indiana Court of Appeals
Iowa Court of Appeals
Kansas Court of Appeals
Kentucky Court of Appeals
Louisiana Court of Appeals
Maryland Court of Appeals
Michigan Court of Appeals
Minnesota Court of Appeals
Mississippi Court of Appeals
Missouri Court of Appeals
Nebraska Court of Appeals
New Mexico Court of Appeals
New York Court of Appeals
North Carolina Court of Appeals
North Dakota Court of Appeals
Ohio Seventh District Court of Appeals
Ohio Eleventh District Court of Appeals
Oregon Court of Appeals
South Carolina Court of Appeals
Tennessee Court of Appeals
Texas Courts of Appeals
Fifth Court of Appeals
Utah Court of Appeals
Court of Appeals of Virginia
Washington Court of Appeals
Supreme Court of Appeals of West Virginia
Wisconsin Court of Appeals

See also

Court of Appeal (disambiguation)
Court of Criminal Appeal (disambiguation)
Appeal
State court (United States)#Nomenclature
List of legal topics
Federal Court of Appeals (disambiguation)